CONFU (The Conference on Fair Use) was a 1997 conference organized by Bruce Lehman, then Commissioner of Patents and Trademarks.

References

External links
CONFU Background from the University of Texas Libraries "Crash Course on Copyright"

1997 conferences
Copyright law
Patent law